The cinema of Croatia has a somewhat shorter tradition than what is common for other Central European countries: the serious beginning of Croatian cinema starts with the rise of the Yugoslavian film industry in the 1940s. Three Croatian feature films were nominated for the Academy Award for Best Foreign Language Film, several of them gained awards at major festivals, and the Croatian contribution in the field of animation is particularly important.

History

Early 20th century

Although motion pictures appeared in Croatia relatively early, for most of the early 20th Century film was almost exclusively the domain of a few dedicated amateur enthusiasts, most notably Josip Karaman in Split and, later, Oktavijan Miletić in Zagreb. In 1906, the first permanent movie theater was established in Zagreb.

Josip Halla produced and directed early documentaries during 1911. and 1912. (Plitvice, Sinjska alka). The first full-length movie was Brcko u Zagrebu released in 1917, and directed by Arsen Maas. It was followed by Matija Gubec, released in the same year and directed by Aca Binički. Neither of these movies survive to this day. In 1918, Croatia film produced additional 5 movies all directed by Josip Halla before the proprietor dissolved the company.

Croatia lacked the political and economic infrastructure to support its own cinema industry.  The most serious effort in that direction before World War II was the series of educational films produced by Škola narodnog zdravlja.

World War II 
The cinema of Croatia became an institution after the establishment of the Independent State of Croatia (NDH) in 1941.  The new Ustaše regime quickly realised the need for modern propaganda tools modeled on those of Nazi Germany and Fascist Italy.  After serious lobbying of these two governments for technical advice and resources, the first propaganda films were made in late 1941.  Croatian filmmakers like Branko Marjanović produced in 1943 the documentary Straža na Drini which later won the Golden Lion award at the Venice Film Festival, attended by Axis power countries.  After the collapse of NDH in 1945, Tito's victorious Communists also recognised the importance of the film industry and decided to build their own. Many technicians and co-workers of the Ustaše propaganda cinema industry during the war were in fact double agents working for the partisan side, with one main task: to keep the technical facilities untouched upon the collapse of NDH.  Therefore, the new regime inherited the technical equipment, and more importantly trained personnel, including directors and top officials.  The result of such a policy was the rapid development of the Croatian film industry, although initially under jurisdiction of the federal government in Belgrade.

Early communist period 

In 1947 Jadran Film studios were founded in Zagreb.

First Golden Era: Late 1950s 
Croatian feature films from the 1950s were not easily distinguishable from those made in the rest of Yugoslavia; this was mainly owing to the free flow of resources, information and talent among the various parts of the country.  It had its first serious peak in the late 1950s, when Croatian film were possibly the most mature in then-young Yugoslav film industry.  The most important author of that era was Branko Bauer, a Dubrovnik-born director whose most famous film is the urban war thriller Don't Turn Around Son (Ne okreći se, sine, 1956). Loosely based on Carol Reed's film Odd Man Out, it describes a destiny of a fugitive from an Ustasha camp who comes to Zagreb to find his son, then realizing that the kid is at the Ustaše boarding school, and completely brainwashed. The hero struggles to leave Zagreb with his son, while deluding the son all the way about the goal of their trip. Among other important Bauer films is Tri Ane (Three Annas, 1959), produced in Macedonia, about a father who finds out that his daughter, whom he presumed to have been killed in the war, could be alive and adult person. Bauer's film Licem u lice (Face To Face, 1962) tells the story about a corrupt director of a construction company who confronts a rebel worker during a communist party cell meeting. It is considered the first overtly political film in Yugoslavia. Another notable 1950s' figure is Nikola Tanhofer, former cinematographer and specialist for various action genres. His most famous film is H8 (1958), a reconstruction of a real traffic accident in which several passengers on an intercity bus between Zagreb and Belgrade were killed, and in which the driver of the car who caused the accident escaped. Following in parallel three vehicles and dozens of picturesque scenes, H8 offers a mosaic-like picture of late 1950s society, and its dramaturgy resembles a - then nonexistent - disaster movie genre. In that period, two Croatian films were Academy Award nominees for foreign language film. Both of them were directed by guests from abroad: an Italian Giuseppe De Santis (Cesta duga godina dana - A Road One Year Long, 1958), and a Slovenian France Štiglic (Deveti krug - Ninth Circle, 1960).

Modernism 
In the 1960s, Croatian cinema saw changes of style, in part owing to directors embracing modernism. The first modernist film was Prometej s otoka Viševice (Prometheus from Island Viševica, 1965) by former cartoonist Vatroslav Mimica.  Using techniques derived from the stream-of consciousness novel, Mimica tells a story about a partisan veteran and communist executive who travels to his native island and faces ghosts of the post-war past.  Among other famous modernist classics, the most significant are Rondo (1965) by Zvonimir Berković, and Breza (Birch, 1967) by Ante Babaja. The most popular author of that era was Krešo Golik, a director of comedies.  Most popular of his films was Tko pjeva zlo ne misli (Who Sings Doesn't Mean Wrong, 1970), a romantic comedy set in 1930s Zagreb.  Croatia also participated in the pan-Yugoslav "black wave", although the best authors and films of the black wave were Serbian.  Most famous black wave classic from Croatia is Lisice (Handcuffs, 1969, by Krsto Papić), a film which is politically relevant because it is Croatia's first cultural product that dealt with the hushed secret of Yugoslav communism: repression against communists who stood by Stalin in famous breakup between Tito and Stalin in 1948.
 
In 1969, the film Battle of Neretva directed by Veljko Bulajić was the one of the most expensive foreign language films made in Yugoslavia.

In the early 1970s, following Yugoslav constitutional changes, Croatia gained more autonomy in shaping its cultural affairs. This, ironically, didn't improve the Croatian film industry. Following the collapse of the Croatian Spring, Croatian Communist authorities in the 1970s pushed for tighter control over films. As a result, the general quality of Croatian films declined.

Prague School and Genre Cinema 
Fresh air came to Yugoslav cinema in the late 1970s and early 1980s with the so-called Prague School, a group of authors educated at the famous Prague Academy FAMU.  Amongst five directors usually presumed to be Prague School, two came from Croatia: Lordan Zafranović, and Rajko Grlić. Grlić's most famous film is You Only Love Once (Samo jednom se ljubi, 1981), a political melodrama that discusses the moral decay of the early communist establishment in the late 1940s.  That film was in Cannes competitions.  Lordan Zafranović's most famous films were Okupacija u 26 slika (Occupation in 26 Pictures) and Pad Italije (The Fall of Italy), both of them war films set in coastal Dalmatia, and both screened at the Cannes festival.

An interesting phenomenon of the 1980s Croatian cinema is the so-called "neo-genre" works from directors who used Western commercial genres such as horror, thriller, or detective movie and implemented it in late-communist societal settings.  The most famous author of that trend is Zoran Tadić, especially with his metaphysical, black-and-white thriller Ritam zločina (Rhythm of the Crime, 1981), and horror movie Treći kljuć (The Third Key, 1983), which discusses the problem of corruption through kafkaesque metaphor.

1990s: period of crisis 
When Croatia became independent in the 1990s, Croatian film suffered a difficult crisis.  Due to the wars, the market for Croatian films shrank, most of the theatres disappeared for good and no Croatian films could expect to be financially viable without even greater support from the state.  In the period of the rule of Franjo Tuđman, the government avoided direct censorship, but demanded more nationalist content, making it less accessible not only to audiences in other countries, but also in Croatia itself.

Croatian Film Today: Third Golden Era 
After the political changes in 2000, Croatian cinema proved it could work in a completely free environment for the first time.  As a result, at the beginning of this decade Croatian cinema flourishes again, and many critics write about "third golden era" (after the 1950s and 1960s).  One of the most popular authors in the contemporary Croatian cinema is Vinko Brešan whose comedies Kako je počeo rat na mom otoku (How the War Started on My Island, 1997), and Maršal (Marshal Tito's Spirit, 1999) mix grotesque humor and political provocation.  Brešan's war drama Svjedoci (Witnesses, based on a novel by Jurica Pavičić) was the first feature film from countries of former Yugoslavia which discussed the war crimes committed by "our guys", not the enemy. Film was screened in competition at the Berlin Film Festival in 2003. A Wonderful Night in Split (Ta divna splitska noć, 2004) by Arsen A. Ostojić received a nomination for the European Discovery EFA award, and Tu (Here, 2003) by Zrinko Ogresta was awarded at the Karlovy Vary Film Festival. Among other distinguished contemporary directors, internationally most recognized is Ognjen Sviličić, whose two films premiered at the Berlin Film Festival - Oprosti za kung fu (Sorry about Kung Fu, 2004) and Armin (2006). Armin was also Croatia's submission for the 2008 Academy Award, and although it didn't earn a nomination in the Best Foreign Language Film category, it did nevertheless receive the prestigious Best Foreign Film of 2007 Award given by the International Federation of Film Critics.

Croatian cinema produces between five and ten feature films per year. Ministry of culture also cofinances approximately 60 minutes of animation per year, plus documentaries and experimental films which have a bigger cultural prestige in Croatia then in other countries of former Yugoslavia. National cinema attendances average at 2.7 million tickets bought by a population of around 4.5 million.

Animation 
The history of animation in Croatia begins with two short animated commercials by Sergej Tagatz in 1922 as a part of "Jadran Film". This was followed by animations produced by Dom narodnog zdravlja such as Ivin zub (Ivo's tooth), Macin nos (Kitty's nose), all of which were directed by Milan Marijanović and drawn by Petar Papp in 1928. In 1929, the first completely animated short was "Martin u nebo, martin iz neba".

Zagreb School

Zagreb also stood out with its own animation film school, Zagrebačka škola crtanog filma (Zagreb Cartoon School). It was given that name at the Cannes Film Festival in 1959, when eight Zagreb cartoons were screened, and the French film historian Georges Sadoul first time named l'école de Zagreb (Zagreb School). The school was based on the production company Zagreb Film, famous for its symbol - a little horse. The most notable member of school (which was never a school in a proper, educational sense) was Montenegro-born author Dušan Vukotić, winner of the 1963 Oscar for his animated short Surogat. He was the first non-American to win the Oscar for animated film. Other important members were Vatroslav Mimica (later a feature filmmaker), and Vlado Kristl, who left Croatia in the early 1960s after the banning of his avant-garde, experimental cartoon Don Kihot (Don Quixote). The Zagreb school was revolutionary for the animations of the 1950s, because it abandoned the Disney-like cartoon style, and introduced visual elements of avant-garde abstract painting, constructivism and cubism. A failure of the school was that it never experimented with other animation techniques than cartoons.  Also, it never reached level of proper industry, remaining more like an artistic workshop.  The Zagreb school was lively and successful during the 1960s and early 1970s, but after that Croatian animation faded and today it does not have the global role it used to have.

Croats in World Cinema 
Many Croats participated in world cinema. Famous actor Rade Šerbedžija (Sherbedgia) was born in Croatia.  Actor starring in the ER TV series, Goran Višnjić, is Croatian, as well as the two time Academy Award winner producer Branko Lustig, and actress Mira Furlan, known for her roles in Babylon 5 and Lost TV series. Furthermore, John Malkovich and Australian-born Eric Bana are of Croatian ancestry.

Croatian film festivals

 Pula Film Festival
 Motovun Film Festival
 Zagreb Film Festival
 ZagrebDox
 Split Film Festival

See also
 List of Croatian films
 Croatian Film Archive
 Cinema of the world
 World cinema

References

Further reading 

In Croatian
"Povijest hrvatskog filma - kronološki pregled", article by film critic Ivo Škrabalo
"Hrvatski film", article by film critic Damir Radić at CultureNet.hr
"Kratki pregled povijesti hrvatskog filma 1896–1990", article by film critic Ivo Kukuljica
‘Kako je počeo rat na mom otoku’ najvažniji je hrvatski film, article by film critic Nenad Polimac
Filmografija hrvatskih cjelovečernjih filmova (po redateljima)
In English
"Young Croatian Film" , article by Ivo Škrabalo
"Moving into the Frame - Croatian Film in the 1990s" , article by Jurica Pavičić
"Croatian Film in the Yugoslav Context in the Second  Half of the Twentieth Century", article by Ivo Škrabalo
"History of Cinema in Croatia" at FilmBirth.com

External links
 Croatian feature films 1944–2006